Ronald Bronstein is an American film director, screenwriter, editor and actor. He directed, wrote and edited the 2007 film Frownland. He is also known as a prominent collaborator of the Safdie brothers, having acted as editor on all their features, and co-written all their screenplays since 2009's Daddy Longlegs.

Filmography
Feature films

Awards and nominations

References

External links
 

American film directors
21st-century American male actors
Living people
Year of birth missing (living people)